Jackson School may refer to:

in the United States

Sheldon Jackson School, listed on the National Register of Historic Places (NRHP), Sitka, Alaska 
Jackson School of Global Affairs, Yale University, New Haven, Connecticut

 Andrew Jackson High School (Jacksonville, Florida)
 Andrew Jackson Language Academy, of Chicago Public Schools, Chicago, Illinois
Jackson City School, K-12 school in Jackson, Kentucky
 Andrew Jackson Academy, of Prince George's County Public Schools, in Forestville, Maryland
Jackson School (St. Louis, Missouri), listed on the NRHP in St. Louis, Missouri
Jackson Jr. High School, Sandusky, Ohio, listed on the NRHP in Sandusky, Ohio
Jackson School (Enid, Oklahoma), NRHP-listed
 Andrew Jackson School, Philadelphia, Pennsylvania (listed in the NRHP as "Federal Street School" and renamed "Fanny Jackson Coppin School" in 2021)
 University School of Jackson, Jackson, Tennessee, college prep school
Stonewall Jackson School (Virginia), Richmond, Virginia, NRHP-listed
The Henry M. Jackson School of International Studies, University of Washington, Seattle, Washington

See also
 Jackson College (disambiguation)
 Jackson University (disambiguation)
 Jackson High School (disambiguation)
 Jackson Elementary School (disambiguation)
 Jackson Academy (disambiguation)